USS Laura Reed (SP-2009), also listed as ID-2009, was a United States Navy patrol vessel in commission from 1917 to 1919.

Laura Reed was built as a civilian schooner of the same name in 1895 at Noank, Connecticut. On 27 November 1917, the U.S. Navy chartered her from her owner, Henry L. Galpin of New Haven, Connecticut, for use as a section patrol boat during World War I. She was enrolled in the Naval Coast Defense Reserve on 30 November 1917, delivered to the Navy on 3 December 1917, and commissioned as USS Laura Reed (SP-2009) at New Haven on 6 December 1917.

Assigned to the 3rd Naval District and based at New Haven, Laura Reed operated as a patrol boat and as a training ship for the Yale University Naval Unit for the rest of World War I.

The Navy returned Laura Reed to Galpin on 7 January 1919.

References

Department of the Navy Naval History and Heritage Command Online Library of Selected Images: Civilian Ships: Laura Reed (American Auxiliary Schooner, 1895); Later USS Laura Reed (ID # 2009), 1917-1919
NavSource Online: Section Patrol Craft Photo Archive Laura reed (SP 2009)

Schooners of the United States Navy
Patrol vessels of the United States Navy
World War I patrol vessels of the United States
Ships built in Groton, Connecticut
1895 ships